Viva Villa! A recovery of the real Pancho Villa, peon, bandit, soldier, patriot is a 1933 biography of Pancho Villa, written by Edgcumb Pinchon and researched by O. B. Stade. It was the basis for the film Viva Villa! the following year, in which Wallace Beery played Villa for the second time.

Editions
New York, Harcourt, Brace and company [c1933]. (o.p.)
New York, Arno Press, 1970 [c1933]. 

1933 non-fiction books
Biographies about politicians
Pancho Villa